Marve Beach (Pronunciation: [maːɾʋe]) is located in the Western Suburb of Malad in the city of Mumbai, India.

Marathi is the most spoken language in this region.
East Indian community, Panchkalshi or Somvanshi Kshatriya Pathare (SKP) and Koli's are the native people of this area.

Details
Ferry Services to the Essel World and Water Kingdom Amusement Parks and Manori are available at its north end. Ferry service to Manori is provided by BEST. You can also carry your two-wheelers onto the Ferry to Manori Island. Marve beach may be reached from Malad Railway Station (West side) by BEST bus no 272. Auto-rickshaws and taxis are available round the clock.
With recent permissions being granted by the government, the site is now witnessing the construction of a Manori to Marve sea link. 

Movement on Marve beach is restricted due to its narrow width as well as presence of Indian Naval base, INS Hamla. The beach is not safe for swimming due to presence of very swift currents and sinking sand.

History
The strip of land from Aksa Beach to Marve used to be one of many islands that lay off the Salsette west coast. These islands seem to have remained separate till as late as 1808. At the time of writing of the old Gazetteer of Thana in 1882, these islands could be reached during low tides by walking across the tidal inlets in between.

Fishing at Marve Beach

This is a good spot for fishing. You will find local boys with strings in hand. They use bait like shells, shrimp and earthworms to lure fish into their hooks. Its a good pass time and hobby. All you need is a string, hook, some bait (wheat flour, earthworm, shells, prawn) and patience. You can go home with some fresh fish and feeling happy.

References

Beaches of Mumbai